Lecithocera praeses is a moth in the family Lecithoceridae. It is found in northern India.

The wingspan is about 25 mm. The forewings are fuscous, the first discal stigma obscurely indicated, the second forming a cloudy dark fuscous transverse mark. The hindwings are grey.

References

Moths described in 1919
praeses